Sahale or Sahalee  may refer to:

Sahale, a mythical spirit of the Puyallup people
Sahale Mountain, a mountain in Washington state
Sahale Glacier, a glacier on Sahale Mountain
Sahalee Country Club, a gold resort in Sammamish, Washington
Sahalee Players Championship, a tournament at the resort